The 2009 European Short Course Swimming Championships was held in Istanbul, Turkey, from Thursday 10 to Sunday 13 December 2009. A temporary swimming pool was built within the Abdi İpekçi Arena.

The event was held over four days with: heats, semifinals and a final for the 50 m and 100 m events and heats and a final for all other events with the exception of the women's 800 m and men's 1500 m freestyle which were heat declared winners. Heats were held in the morning, with semifinals, finals and the fastest heat of the distance freestyle events in the evening.

Each nation was permitted to enter three swimmers into each individual event, however only the fastest two were able to progress to the semifinal and/or final.

Participating nations
Of the 51 member nations of LEN, 41 participated in the championships. Albania and Liechtenstein made their European Short Course Championships debut.

Medal table

Medal summary

Men's events

Legend: WR – World record; WBT – World best time; ER – European record; CR – Championship record

Women's events

Legend: WR – World record; WBT – World best time; ER – European record; CR – Championship record

Records
The table below lists the world (WR), European (ER) and Championships (CR) records broken at the meet. Times displayed in shaded cells were subsequently broken later in the meet.

See also
2009 in swimming

References
Notes

Sources

External links
Official Championships Website
 Swim Rankings Results
 Results book

European Short Course Swimming Championships
European Short Course Swimming Championships
2009
2009
2009
Swimming competitions in Turkey
December 2009 sports events in Europe
2000s in Istanbul